Vasily Dmitriyevich Guslyannikov (born 21 April 1949) is a Russian retired politician, who served as first and only President of Mordovia in 1991–1993.

Biography 
Vasily Guslyannikov was born in 1949 in Voronezh Oblast. Since 1961 he lives in Mordovia. In 1971 he graduated from the Mordovian State University. Since 1973, he was an engineer at the semiconductor plant "Elektrovypryamitel", Saransk. In 1990 he was elected a People's Deputy of the Mordovian ASSR. He led the Democratic Russia electoral bloc, which had a majority in the Saransk City Council.

In October 1990, the first secretary of the CPSU regional committee Anatoly Berezin, resigned, who had led the republic for 19 years. His retirement ensured rapid disorganization of the one-party government in Mordovia. In October 1991. the Supreme Soviet of Mordovia established the presidency and called the election for 14 December 1991, but the former nomenklatura failed to gather together and nominate a single candidate. As a result of vote splitting in the first round Supreme Soviet chairman Nikolay Biryukov came first with only 18.9% of the vote, and Guslyannikov received 16.6%. He won in runoff with 56% of the vote.

A former engineer with little to no political experience, Guslyannikov faced opposition both from nomenklatura and the democrats and was unable to form a sustainable administration. In April 1993, taking advantage of growing discontent in the public, the Supreme Soviet voted to abolish the presidential office and appointed Valery Shvetsov as prime minister. As a result, two parallel governments existed for some time, but gradually most of Guslyannikov's ministers went to work with Shvetsov. In June 1993, the Constitutional Court of Russia recognized abolition of Mordovian presidency as legal.

Since 1996, Vasily Guslyannikov chairs Mordovian Human Rights Center. He is married and has two daughters.

References

Sources 

1949 births
Living people
People from Povorinsky District
Mordovian State University alumni
Heads of the Republic of Mordovia